This is a list of potentially active volcanoes in the Philippines, as classified by the Philippine Institute of Volcanology and Seismology.

List

See also 
 List of active volcanoes in the Philippines
 List of inactive volcanoes in the Philippines
 List of mountains in the Philippines

References
 Philippine Institute of Volcanology and Seismology (PHIVOLCS) Potentially Active Volcano list
  Philippine Institute of Volcanology and Seismology (PHIVOLCS) Active Volcano list
   Philippine Institute of Volcanology and Seismology (PHIVOLCS) Inactive Volcano list

External links
 

 
Volcanoes
Philippines, potentially active
potentially
Volcanism of the Philippines